Self-assembling peptides are a category of peptides which undergo spontaneous assembling into ordered nanostructures. Originally described in 1993, these designer peptides have attracted interest in the field of nanotechnology for their potential for application in areas such as biomedical nanotechnology, tissue cell culturing, molecular electronics, and more.

Effectively self-assembling peptides act as building blocks for a wide range of material and device applications. The essence of this technology is to replicate what nature does: to use molecular recognition processes to form ordered assemblies of building blocks that are capable of conducting biochemical activities.

Background
Peptides are able to perform as excellent building blocks for a wide range of materials as they can be designed to combine with a range of other building blocks such as lipids, sugars, nucleic acids, metallic nanocrystals and so on; this gives the peptides an edge over carbon nanotubes, which are another popular nanomaterial, as the carbon structure is unreactive. They also exhibit properties such as biocompatibility and molecular recognition; the latter is particularly useful as it enables specific selectivity for building ordered nanostructures. Additionally peptides have superb resistance to extreme conditions of high/low temperatures, detergents and denaturants.

The ability of peptides to perform self-assembly allows them to be used as fabrication tools, which is currently and will continue to grow as a fundamental part of nanomaterials production. The self-assembling of peptides is facilitated through the molecules’ structural and chemical compatibility with each other, and the structures formed demonstrates physical and chemical stability.

A great advantage of using self-assembling peptides to build nanostructures in a bottom-up approach is that specific features can be incorporated; the peptides can be modified and functionalized. This approach means that the final structures are built from the self-integration of small, simple building blocks. Essentially this approach is needed for nanoscale structure, as the top-down method of miniaturizing device using sophisticated lithography and etching techniques has reached a physical limit. Moreover, the top-down approach is applicable to mainly only silicon based technology, and is unable to be used for biological developments.

The peptide structure is organized hierarchically into four levels. The primary structure of a peptide is the sequence of the amino acids on the peptide chain. Amino acids are monomer molecules that carries a carboxyl and an amine functional groups; a spectrum of other chemical groups are attached to different amino acids, such as thiols and alcohols. This facilitates the wide range of chemical interactions and therefore molecular recognitions that peptides are capable of. For designer self-assembling peptides both natural and non-natural amino acids are used. They link together in a controlled manner to form short peptides which links to form long polypeptide chains.

Along these chains the alternating amine (NH) and carbonyl (CO) groups are highly polar and they readily form hydrogen bonds with each other. These hydrogen bonds binds peptide chains together to give rise to secondary structures. Stable secondary structures include the alpha-helices and beta-sheets. Unstable secondary structures are random loops, turns and coils that are formed. The secondary structure that is formed is dependent on the primary structure; different sequences of the amino acids exhibit different preferences.
Secondary structures usually fold into with a variety of loops and turns into a tertiary structure. What differentiates the secondary structure from the tertiary structure is primarily that the latter includes non-covalent interactions. The quaternary structure is the combination of two or more different chains of polypeptide to form what is known as a protein sub-unit.

The self-assembly process of the peptide chains is dynamic—reassembly occurs repeatedly in a self-healing manner. The type of interactions that occurs to reassemble peptide structures include van der Waals forces, ionic bonds, hydrogen bonds and hydrophobic forces. These forces also facilitate the molecular recognition function that the peptides encompasses. These interactions works on a basis of preference dependent on energy properties and specificity.

A range of different nanostructures can be formed. Nanotubes are defined as an elongated nano-object with a definite inner hole. Nanofibrils are solid on the inside, as opposed to hollow nanotubes.

Processing/Synthesis
Peptide synthesis can be easily conducted by the established method of solid-phase chemistry in grams or kilograms quantities. The d-isomer conformation can be used for peptide synthesis.

Nanostructures can be made by dissolving dipeptides in 1,1,1,3,3, 3-hexafluoro-2-propanol at 100 mg/ml and then diluting it with water for a concentration of less than 2 mg/ml. Multiwall nanotubes with a diameter of 80–300 nm, made of dipeptides from the diphenylalanine motif of Alzheimer's β-amyloid peptide are made by this method. If a thiol is introduced into the diphenylalanine then nano-spheres can be formed instead; nanospheres of 10–100 nm diameter from a diphenylgalcine peptide can also be made this way.

Characterization
Atomic force microscopy can measure mechanical properties of nanotubes. Scanning-electron and atomic-forces microscopy is used to examine Lego peptide nanofiber structures.

Dynamic light scattering studies show structures of surfactant peptides.
Surfactant peptides has been studied using a quick-freeze /deep–etch sample preparation method which minimizes effects on the structure. The sample nanostructures are flash freeze at −196 °C and can be studied three-dimensionally. Transmission electron microscopy was used.

Using computer technology, a molecular model of peptides and their interactions can be built and studied.

Specific tests can be performed on certain peptides; for example a fluorescent emission test could be applied to amyloid fibrils by using the dye Thioflavin T that binds specifically to the peptide and emits blue fluorescence when excited.

Structure

Dipeptides
The simplest peptide building blocks are dipeptides. Nanotubes formed from dipeptides are the widest amongst peptide nanotubes. An example of a dipeptide that has been studied is such a peptide is one from the diphenylalanine motif of the Alzheimer's β-amyloid peptide.

Dipeptides have also been shown to self assemble into hydrogels, another form of nanostructures, when connected to the protecting group, Fluorenylmethyloxycarbonyl chloride. Experiments focusing on the dipeptide Fmoc-diphenylalaine have been conducted that have explored the mechanism in which Fmoc-diphenylalanine self assembles into hydrogels via π-π interlocked β-sheets. Phenylalanine has an aromatic ring, a crucial part of the molecule due to its high electron-density, which favors self-assembly and during self-assembly these rings stack which enables the assembly to occur.

Lego peptides / Ionic self-complementary peptides
These peptides are approximately 5 nm in size and have 16 amino acids. The class of Lego peptides has the unique characteristics of having two distinct surfaces being either hydrophobic or hydrophilic, similar to the pegs and holes of Lego blocks. The hydrophobic side promotes self-assembly in water and the hydrophilic sides has a regular arrangement of charged amino acids residues, which in turn brings about a defined pattern of ionic bonds. The arrangement of the residues can be classified according to the order of the charges; Modulus I has a charge pattern of “+-+-+-,” modulus II “++--++--“ and modulus III “+++---+++” and so on.
The peptides self-assemble into nano fibers approximately 10 nm long in the presence of alkaline cations or an addition of peptide solution. The fibers forms ionic interactions with each other to form checkerboard like matrices, which develops into a scaffold hydrogel with a high water content of larger than 99.5- 99.9% and pores of 10-200 nm diameter. These hydrogels allows neurite outgrowth and therefore is can be used as scaffold for tissue engineering.

Surfactant peptides
Surfactant–like peptides which undergo self-assembly in water to form nanotubes and nanovesicles have been designed using natural lipids as a guide. This class of peptides has a hydrophilic head (with one or two charged amino acids such as aspartic and glutamic acids, or lysine or histidine acids) with a hydrophobic tail (with 4 or more hydrophobic amino acids such as alanine, valine or leucine). The peptide monomers are about 2-3 nm long and consist of seven or eight amino acids; the length of the peptide can be adjusted by adding or removing acids.

In water surfactant peptides undergo self assembling to form well ordered nanotubes and nanovesicles of 30–50 nm through intermolecular hydrogen bonds and the packing of the hydrophobic tails in between the residues in a manner similar to micelle formation.Transmission electron microscopy examination on quick-frozen samples of surfactant peptides structures showed helical open-ended nanotubes. The samples also showed a dynamic behaviours and some vesicles “buds” out of the peptide nanotubes.

Molecular paint or carpet peptides
This class of peptides undergoes self assembling on a surface and form monolayers just few nanometers thick. This type of molecular “paint” or “carpet” peptides are able to form cell patterns, interact with or trap other molecules onto the surface. This class of peptides consists of three segments: the head is a ligand part which has functional groups attached for recognition by other molecules or cell surface receptors; the middle segment is a “linker”which allows the head to interact at a distance away from the surface. The linker also controls the flexibility and the rigidity of the peptide structure. On the other end of the linker was a surface anchor where a chemical group on the peptide forms a covalent bond with a particular surface.
This class of peptides has the unique property of being able to change their molecular structure dramatically. This property is best illustrated using an example. The DAR16-IV peptide, has 16 amino acid and forms a 5 nm β-sheet structure at ambient temperatures; a swift change in structure occurs at high temperature or a change in pH and a 2.5 nm α-helix forms.

Cyclic peptides
Extensive research has been performed on nanotubes formed by stacking cyclic peptides with an even number of alternating D and L amino acids. These nanotubes are the narrowest formed by peptides. The stacking occurs through intermolecular hydrogen bonding and the end product is cylindrical structures with the amino acid side chains of the peptide defining the properties of the outer surface of the tube and the peptide backbone determining the properties of the inner surface of the tube. Polymers can also be covalently attached to the peptides in which case a polymer shell around nanotubes can be formed. By applying peptide design, the inner diameter, which is completely uniform, can be specified; the outer surface properties can also be deliberated by peptide design and therefore these cyclic nanotubes are able to form in range of different environments.

Property evaluation
– Discussion of properties (mechanical, electronic, optical, magnetic...) of the material your chosen, indicate what the major differences would be if the same material was not on the nano-scale.
Nanotubes formed from dipeptides are stable under extreme conditions. Dry nanotubes do not degrade until 200 °C; nanotubes display exceptional chemical stability at a range of pH and in the presence of organic solvents. This is a marked difference from natural biological systems which are often unstable and sensitive to temperature and the chemical conditions.

Indentation atomic force microscopy experiments showed that dry nanotubes on mica gives an average stiffness of 160 N/m and a high Young's modulus of 19–27 GPa. Although they are less stiff than carbon and non-carbon nanotubes, with these values these nanotubes are amongst some of the stiffest known biological materials. The mechanisms which facilitates the mechanical stiffness has been suggested to be the intermolecular hydrogen bonds and rigid aromatic side chains on the peptides.
Surface properties
For nanotubes, apart from those made by cyclic peptides, the surface properties of the inner and outer surface has not yet been successfully independently modified. Hence it presents a limitation that the inner and outer tube surfaces are identical.

Molecular assembly mostly occurs through weak non-covalent bonds which includes: hydrogen bonds, ionic bonds, van der Waals interactions, and hydrophobic interactions.

Self-assembling peptides versus carbon nanotubes
Carbon nanotubes (CNTs) is another type of nanomaterial which has attracted a lot of interest for its potential as being building blocks for bottom-up applications. They have excellent mechanical, electrical, and thermal properties and can be fabricated to a wide range of nanoscale diameters, making them attractive and appropriate for the developments of electronic and mechanical devices. They demonstrate metal-like properties and are able to act as remarkable conductors.
However, there are several areas where peptides has advantages over CNTs. As mentioned in the background section, one advantage that peptides has over carbon as nanosize building blocks is that they have almost limitless chemical functionality compared with the very chemical interactions that carbons can perform due to their nonreactiveness. Furthermore, CNTs exhibits strong hydrophobicity which results in a tendency to clump in aqueous solutions and therefore has limited solubility; their electrical properties are also affected by humidity, and the presence of oxygen, N2O and NH3. It is also difficult for to produce CNTs with uniform properties and this pose serious drawbacks as for commercial purposes the reproducibility of precise structural properties is a key concern. Lastly, CNTs are expensive with prices in the range of hundreds of dollars per gram, rendering most applications of them commercially unviable.

Present and future applications
The appeal of designer peptides is that they are structurally simple and it is uncomplicated and affordable to produce them on a large scale.

Cell culturing
Peptide scaffolds formed from LEGO peptides has been used extensively for 3D cell culturing as they closely resemble the porosity and the structure of extra-cellular matrices. These scaffolds have also been used in cell proliferation and differentiation into desired cell types.
Experimentations with rat neurons demonstrated LEGO peptides’ usefulness in cell culturing. Rat neurons that were attached to the peptides projected functional axons that followed the contour as set out by the peptide scaffolds.

Biomedical applications
By examining the behaviours of the molecular ‘switch’ peptides more information about interactions between proteins and more significantly the pathogenesis of some protein conformational diseases can be obtained. These diseases include scrapie, kuru, Huntington's, Parkinson's and Alzheimer's diseases.
Self-assembling and surfactant peptides can be used as targeting delivery systems for genes, drugs and RNAi. Research has already shown that cationic dipeptides NH2-Phe-Phe-NH2 nanovesicles, which are about 100 nm in diameter, can be absorbed into cells through endocytosis and deliver oligonucleotides into the cell; this is one example of how peptide nanostructure can in used in gene and drug delivery.It is also envisaged that water-soluble molecules and biological molecules would be able to be delivered to cells in this way. Self-assembling LEGO peptides can form biologically compatible scaffolds for tissue repair and engineering. this area is of great potential as a large number of diseases cannot be cured by small molecule drugs; a cell-based therapy approach is needed and peptides could potentially play a huge role in this.
Cyclic peptide nanotubes formed from self-assembly are able to act as ion channels, which forms pores through the cell membrane and causes cellular osmotic collapse. Peptide can be designed to preferentially form on bacterial cell membranes and thus these tubes are able to perform as antibacterial and cytotoxin agents.

Molecular electronics applications
Molecular ‘switches’ peptides can be made into nanoswitches when an electronic component is incorporated. Metal nanocrystals can be covalently linked to the peptides to make them electronically responsive; research is currently being conducted on how to develop electronically controlled molecules and molecular ‘machines’ using these molecular ‘switches’.
Peptide nanofibers can also be used as growth templates for a range of inorganic materials such as silver, gold, platinum, cobalt, nickel and various semiconducting materials. Electrons transferring aromatic moieties can also be attached to the side chains of peptides to form conducting nanostructures which can able to transfer electrons in a certain direction.
Metal and semiconductor binding peptides has been used for the fabrication of nanowires. Peptides self-assemble into hollow nanotubes to act as casting molds; metal ions that migrates inside the tube undergoes reduction to metallic form. The peptide ‘ mold’ can then be enzymatically destroyed to produce metal nanowires of about 20 nm diameter. This has been done making gold nanowires and this application is especially significant in light of the fact that nanowires of this scale cannot be made by lithography. Researchers has also successfully developed multi layer nanocables with a silver core nanowire, a peptide insulation layer and a gold outer coat, This is done by reducing AgNO3 inside nanotubes, and then bounding a layer of thiol containing peptides with gold particles attached. This layer acts as a nucleation site during the next step where process of electroless deposition layers a coating of gold on the nanotubes to form metal-insulator-metal trilayer coaxial nanocables. Peptide nanotubes are able to produce nanowires of uniform size and this is particularly useful in the nanoelectric applications as electrical and magnetic properties are sensitive to size.
Nanotube's exceptional mechanical strength and stability makes them excellent materials for application in this area.
Nanotubes has also been used in the developments of electrochemical biosensing platforms and has proved to have great potential. Dipeptide Nanotubes deposited on graphite electrodes improved electrode sensitivity; thiol-modified nanotubes deposited on gold with a coating of enzymes improved sensitivity and reproducibility for the detection of glucose and ethanol, as well as a shortened detection time, large current density and improved stability. Nanotubes have also been successfully coated with proteins, nanocrystals, and metalloporphyrin through hydrogen bonding and these coated tubes have great potentials in the areas of chemical sensors.
Designed peptides with a known structure that would self-assemble into a regular growth template would enable the self-assembly of nanoscale electronic circuits and devices. However, one issue that has yet to be resolved is the ability to control the positioning of the nanostructures. This positioning relative to substrates, to each other and to other functional component is crucial and although progress has been made in this domain, more work has to be completed before this control can be established.

Miscellaneous applications
Molecular carpet/paint peptides can be used in a spectrum of diverse industries. They can be used as ‘nano-organizers’ for non-biological materials, or could be used to study cell-cell communications and behavior.
It has also been found that the catalytic abilities of lipase enzyme is greatly improved when encapsulated in peptide nanotube. After incubation in nanotubes for a week, the catalytic activities of the enzyme is improved by 33% compared with free-standing lipases at room temperature; comparison at 65 °C the improvement rises to 70%. It is suggested that the enhanced ability is due to a conformational change to an enzymatically active structure.

Limitations
Although well ordered nanostructures have already been successfully formed from self-assembling peptides, their potential will not be fully fulfilled until useful functionality is incorporated into the structures.

Moreover, so far most of the peptide structures formed are in 1 or 2-D, whereas in nature most biological structures are in 3D.
Critique has been made in light of the fact that there is a lack in theoretical knowledge about the self-assembling behaviours of peptides. This knowledge could prove to be very useful in facilitating rational designs and precise control of the peptide assemblies.
Lastly, although an extensive amount of work is being conducted on developing self-assembling peptide related applications, issues such as commercial viability and processability has not been paid the same amount of attention. Yet it is crucial for these issues to be assessed if the applications were to be realized.

References

Further reading
 

Peptides
Chemical reactions